The Alchemist is a 1981 American horror film about a man who desires to avenge a curse placed on him by an evil magician. The film was directed by Charles Band (under the pseudonym James Amante), and stars Robert Ginty, Lucinda Dooling, and John Sanderford.

Premise
In 1955, young waitress Lenora (Lucinda Dooling) finds herself inexplicably driving down the California highway to an unknown destination. This doesn't bode well for Cam (John Sanderford), the hitchhiker she picked up, because he has to endure her somnambulist driving. The duo eventually end up at a graveside in the woods and meet alchemist Aaron (Robert Ginty), who is just as shocked to see them as Lenora appears to be the reincarnation of his wife who was murdered nearly 100 years earlier.

Production and release
The Alchemist was made in 1981, but not released until 1984 (in Norway, on video) and May 31, 1985 in USA. Band was brought in to replace the original director, who had completed 2–3 days of filming.

The film was released for the only time on DVD by Video International on January 7, 2008.

Reception
VideoHound's Golden Movie Retriever awarded the film a WOOF!, their lowest rating for a film, calling it "painfully routine".
Richard Scheib on his film review website Moria.co awarded the film a half a star out of five, calling the film, calling it "dull", and panned the film's slow-paced direction, and ineffective special effects. Variety called it "a dull, old-fashioned (with gore added) supernatural horror film". Time Out called it a "spectacularly low-energy multi-pastiche".

The film's score, by Richard Band, received some praise, with Thomas S. Hischak in his book The Encyclopedia of Film Composers calling it "satisfying" and remarking on the "elegant main theme", and the book Contemporary North American Film Directors: A Wallflower Critical Guide describing it as "a far better score than [the film] requires or deserves".

References

External links
 
 
 
 

1983 films
1983 horror films
Empire International Pictures films
1980s English-language films
American supernatural horror films
Films directed by Charles Band
Films scored by Richard Band
1980s American films
1980s supernatural horror films